David John Brooke von Hoesslin (born 10 May 1975) is a South African former rugby union international who represented the Springboks in five Test matches.

Born in Stellenbosch, von Hoesslin was a scrum-half and made all of his Springboks Test appearances in 1999, debuting against Italy in Port Elizabeth, where he came off the bench. He was the starting scrum-half when the Springboks played Italy a week later in Durban and scored two first half tries in a 101–0 victory, which was at the time a team record winning margin. He also featured in the 1999 Tri Nations Series, including the Springboks's 0–28 loss to the All Blacks in Dunedin, for which he and his halfback partner Gaffie du Toit were singled out for public criticism by coach Nick Mallett.

In 2005 he was signed by Harlequins to bolster their half-back line.

See also
List of South Africa national rugby union players

References

External links

1975 births
Living people
South African rugby union players
South Africa international rugby union players
Harlequin F.C. players
Lions (United Rugby Championship) players
Stormers players
Sharks (rugby union) players
Rugby union scrum-halves
Rugby union players from the Western Cape
People from Stellenbosch